John Hume DD (c.1703–26 June 1782) was an English bishop.

Early life and education

John Hume was the son of Rev. William Hume (1651-1714) of Milton, Devon, and his wife Jane Robertson (d. 1733). Hume matriculated at Merton College, Oxford on 31 March 1721, aged 15. He migrated to Corpus Christi College, Oxford, graduating B.A. 1724, M.A. 1727, B.D. & D.D. 1743.

Career
He became a Canon of Westminster (28 June 1742 – 1748) and a Canon of St Paul's Cathedral (30 March 1748 – 1766).

He was rector of Barnes, London from 1749 to 1758; he was appointed Bishop of Bristol in 1756. In 1758 he became Bishop of Oxford and Dean of St Paul's, and in 1766 Bishop of Salisbury and ex officio Chancellor of the Order of the Garter.

He died on 26 June 1782 and was buried in Salisbury Cathedral on 6 July 1782. The monument was sculpted by William Osmond.

Family

He married twice. His first wife Ann died in 1757 without children. His second wife, Lady Mary Hay (d.1805), youngest daughter of George Hay, 8th Earl of Kinnoull. By his second wife he had three daughters.

References

External links

1782 deaths
Alumni of Merton College, Oxford
Alumni of Corpus Christi College, Oxford
Bishops of Bristol
Bishops of Oxford
Bishops of Salisbury
Deans of St Paul's
Canons of Westminster
Chancellors of the Order of the Garter
1700s births
18th-century Church of England bishops